Zion Zachariah Clark (born 27 September 1997) is an American wrestler, professional mixed martial artist, and wheelchair racer. Clark was born without legs due to a rare disorder called Caudal regression syndrome. He attended Kent State University at Tuscarawas, Ohio, where he was a member of the wrestling team.

Wrestling
During his freshman and sophomore years at Massillon Washington High School, Clark had no wins in wrestling. However, he increased his training during his junior season, and in his senior season compiled a 33–15 record. He then attended Kent State University, where he competed in wrestling and wheelchair racing.

Mixed martial arts career
Clark made his professional debut on December 17, 2022, against Eugene Murray. He won the fight via a unanimous decision.

In media
Clark is featured in the 2018 documentary Zion. It was an official selection at the Sundance Film Festival and later streamed on Netflix. The documentary won two Emmys at the 40th annual Sports Emmy Awards.

Personal life
After growing up in Ohio's foster care system, Clark was adopted by Kimberly Hawkins.

References

1997 births
American male mixed martial artists
Mixed martial artists utilizing collegiate wrestling
American wheelchair racers
American male sport wrestlers
Amateur wrestlers
Kent State Golden Flashes wrestlers
Sportspeople from Massillon, Ohio
Living people